The majority of the Arabs in Singapore are Hadhramis tracing their ancestry from the southern part of the Arabian Peninsula called Hadhramaut, Yemen. Some of the people living there are known as “Hadhramis”. The land there is mostly desert region. The fertile areas, suitable for cultivation, are small and concentrated in the wadi region. This harsh natural environment drove the Hadhramis to travel out of the area to trade and acquire the necessary items they needed. They had travelled to and engaged in trade in several areas: Hyderabad, India (before 1947), Dar-es-Salaam and East Africa as well as Malaya and the Netherlands East Indies.

Broadly speaking, the Hadhramis have three social strata. The first are the Ba 'Alawi sada who are the descendants of the grandsons of the Islamic prophet, Muhammad, namely Hasan ibn Ali and Husayn ibn Ali, and are known by their singular honorific "Syed" for men and “Sharifah” for women. In Yemen and elsewhere, many among them are revered religious scholars and administrators. The second are the Mashaikhs, many among whom are scholars too, and sometimes, farmer. Their family names (surnames) often begin with "Ba-" (for example Basharahil, Bahashwan). Then there the Gabails, also known as the Kathiris, who are a collection of tribes. Most among them are landowners. Among the prominent Gabail families are the Bin Thalibs and Bin Abdats and the honorific "Sheikh" (also spelled “Shaikh”) and "Sheikhah" (also spelled "Shaykhah" and "Shaikha") (for men and women respectively) often precede their names.

History

Hadhrami migration
The early Arab settlers came to Singapore with wealth made in Indonesia. Being already familiar with Malay customs, they were accepted by the Malays living there. In 1824, the population of Singapore was 10,683. Out of this total, there were only 15 Arabs. In 1829, there were 34 Arabs with only 3 Arab women among them. Their population increased as follows:

(Source: Lim Lu Sia, 1987:32)

The census for 1970s and 1980s is not believed to reflect the actual number of Arabs in Singapore. This is because a number of Arabs have been officially registered as “Malay”. After Singapore became an independent country in 1965, the ethnic Malays enjoyed educational benefits granted by the state. Some Arab families then listed the ethnicity of their children to "Malay" to receive these benefits. Because of intermarriage between Malay or Indian Muslim men and Arab women, some Malays and Indians have Arab ancestry. People of Arab descent matrilineally are not officially listed as Arabs as a person's race in Singapore, until 2010, was determined by his father's race.

Identification with the Malays in Singapore

In Singapore, the Malays form the largest Muslim community. As such, being a Muslim in Singapore is usually closely associated with being Malay. Some Arabs had chosen to identify themselves as Malays. The Arabs here had been exposed to Malay culture and lifestyles and considered themselves a part of the Malay community. This choice of change of ethnicity on their part was also made possible because of their shared religion with the Malays, intermarriage with them and also an acceptance and assimilation of Malay culture and values by the Arab community in Singapore.

In fact, the Arabs have not only assimilated Malay culture and values but have played an active part in the lives of the Malay community in the religious and economic areas as well as providing intellectual and social leadership. This took place even in the early years of British rule in Singapore. During this time, the Hadhrami Arabs worked in land and property dealing, batik trade, importing goods from the Arab countries and as brokers. Some of them also became teachers of the Islamic faith and organizers of the Haj.

Contribution to Singapore

The position and contribution of the Arabs to Singapore can be seen when a member of the Aljuneid clan was appointed as a member of the mostly European-dominated Chamber of Commerce in 1837. Two Arabs, Syed Mohamed bin Ahmed Assegaf and Syed Mohammed bin Syed Omar Assegaf, served as Municipal Commissioners in 1872–1898 and 1928–1933 respectively.

The Arabs formed their own association in 1946 which still exists today. The objectives then were to promote and enhance Islam as well as the use of Arabic language. By the time the Arab Association Singapore was founded, the Arab traders were the wealthiest community in Singapore. Syed Ali Mohammed Al-Juneid, for instance, donated a large plot of land near Victoria and Arab Streets to Tan Tock Seng’s hospital. He also built public wells across town to provide free water, at a time when none was being supplied by the municipality. The Al-Juneid family – after whom Aljunied Road is named – made large donations to the construction of the Town Hall (now the Victoria Memorial and Concert Hall), while paying for the building of public bridges. The Al-Kaff footbridge on the Singapore River takes its name from another prominent Arab family, which built the first Japanese Gardens opened to the public before World War II (where the Sennett private housing estate is today).

The Arabs were also well known for their contribution to  lands (Arab's land holdings charitable trust). The  land of Syed Mohamed Assegaf was formed in 1904 to help support efforts for orphanages, mosques and Islamic schools. Today, the Aljuneid Islamic School and the Assegaf Islamic School stand as a legacy of the contribution of the Arab community towards Islamic education in Singapore. Currently, almost the entire area Singapore central business district were once the  lands which the government acquired in the 1970s with only the minimal compensation paid to the owners.

Arab role in trade
The Arabs had played a dominant role in trade in South East Asia since the fifteenth century. When Sir Stamford Raffles founded Singapore in 1819, he attracted the Arab traders to his new city. By 1824, there were 15 Arabs out of a population of 10,683 and Raffles anticipated a rapid growth in Arab immigration. His blueprint for Singapore included plans for an Arab district. In his instructions to a Singapore housing committee in 1822, he stated:

"The Arab population would require every consideration. No situation will be more appropriate for them than the vicinity of the Sultan’s residence..." (Buckley 1902:85)

The first Arabs to arrive in Singapore in 1819 were two wealthy merchants from Palembang, Sumatra. Their numbers gradually increased and by 1846, there were five important Arab merchant houses. The al-Junied [al-junaid] الجنيد family in Singapore grew to be a rich and influential as did the al-Kaffs [al-kāf] الكاف and the al-Saggoffs [al-saqqāf] السقاف. There are streets and even a town council named after them.

The al-Saggoffs were spice traders and became influential by marrying into a royal family from the Celebes. They acquired many properties, like the other Arab families, including the "Perseverance Estate" where they grew lemon grass. The estate is now considered to be the heart of the Muslim community in Singapore. As well as being successful merchants and land owners, the family became involved in civic affairs. The family members, at times, held civic office from the 1870s until 1965. The al-Kaff family arrived here in 1852. All these families lived in mansions of considerable opulence like the al-Kaff house. Today, the building is a restaurant called Alkaff Mansion as a gesture to preserve the name. Other than that, it has no other Hadhrami connection, either in architectural style or ownership.

Arab business domination
The Arabs dominated the businesses in Singapore, principally in oil and trade, during the British colonial period. Arabic culture had a strong influence on the local Malay culture through its religion. This is seen in the Middle Eastern-style architecture of the mosques in Kampong Glam.

In the heyday of Arab prosperity, the Arabs in Singapore maintained close links with Hadhramaut and large amounts of money were sent back to the homeland. The rich built themselves splendid houses, like the Alkaff house. They also sent their sons back to Hadhramaut for periods of time to enhance their identity as Hadhramis. This custom maintained their language and Hadhrami culture. It even resulted in some Malay being incorporated in the spoken Arabic of Hadhramaut (see Hadhrami Arabic). Hadhramaut was regarded as a cultural training ground of the young Arab men and the time spent there was the final preparation for manhood. Upon their return to Singapore, these young men would take their place in the family businesses.

After World War II
During World War II it became impossible for the Hadhramis in Singapore to travel abroad but they continued to do so thereafter. It was then that the Arab families took a keener interest in the education of their children. The richer families sent their children to London to study and the children of others spent time working in Aden rather than just going to Hadhramaut. The cultural and linguistic links were still maintained. However, the family incomes continued to decline.

The 1960s
In the 1960s, there came a major change. The independence of South Yemen with a communist government in power put an end to the Singapore Hadramis returning home. At the same time, the economic developments in Singapore made the importance of the English language and of obtaining an education even more essential. The new Arab generation had grown up without speaking Arabic and had lost both its identity and its affiliation with Hadhramaut. Some families, in the oil boom of the 1970s, tried sending their sons to Saudi Arabia or Arab States of the Persian Gulf, but it was not a success. The young men did not like living in Saudi Arabia as their prospects in Singapore were better than on the Arabian peninsula.

Present day

Identity crisis
The Hadhrami community in Singapore is now facing an identity crisis. The younger generation does not speak Arabic and has lost its affiliation with Hadhramaut, partly because Hadhramis have stopped sending their children back there. Due to the above-mentioned factors and the current ongoing civil war in Yemen, it is unlikely that a strong link with Hadhramaut would be established anytime in the near future.

Singaporean Arabs census today
Singapore is a cosmopolitan city state made up of various races. The 1990 census shows the Chinese as the majority with around 74% of the population, the indigenous Malays with 14%, the Indians at less than 10% and the balance placed in the category of "others". This "others" category includes, but is not limited to, Filipinos, Eurasians, Vietnamese and Arabs. The census shows Arabs to be around 7,000, but unofficial estimates place the actual number of Arabs at around 10,000.

The Singapore Hadramis were major landlords, the large families having substantial properties held in trust, which ranged from private family trusts to public charitable trusts. Most of the land in today’s central business district of Singapore was once owned by Hadrami . These , bearing the family names, whether private or charitable, gave considerable prestige to the Arab community among the Muslims in Singapore.
The first three factors have been a direct result of government policies.

First factor
The first was the enactment of the Administration of Muslim Law Act 1968. The Singapore Islamic Council is the corporate body now empowered to oversee the administration of charitable  in Singapore. Prior to the Act, the Arab trustees were in total control of their . With the transfer of the ’ administration to the Council, the Arabs’ authority over them was considerably undermined.

Second factor
The second factor was the Rent Control Act 1947. The rents of pre-war properties were controlled and, in effect, frozen. As the Arab  were mostly pre-war properties, the income of the Arab families have correspondingly diminished. The decline in the income from the  resulted in the diminishing economic influence of the Arabs. The Arabs were also not prepared for such a drastic drop in their income. They had not given their children a Western education. Many Arabs went to madrasas or Islamic schools and some families never sent their children for any formal education at all. The changing developments that started taking place in Singapore since the 1960s has made it difficult for the Arabs to compete.

Third factor
The third factor was the Land Acquisition Act. Given the size of the island, land is scarce in Singapore and it has been the government’s policy to have complete control over land usage. The Land Acquisition Act empowered the government to acquire land required for urban renewal and compensation to be paid on a predetermined formula. The compensation amounts calculated would be significantly lower than the prevailing market value. The government embarked on a major acquisition campaign in the 1970s and 1980s. Pre-war properties were the major target for acquisition as Singapore underwent a modernisation programme. These pre-war properties were subject to rent control and had tenants that could not be removed.

The  were not in a position to develop these properties. Significant properties owned by Arab  were acquired and minimal compensation paid. This eroded Arab wealth and influence. It also diminished the Arab identity as substantial landlords.

The Sheikh Salem Talib Family settlement, for example, used to have more than three pages in its audited accounts listing the properties held, but the current accounts have less than one page. More than half of the properties were acquired by the government. The al-Saggoff Perseverance Estate was acquired in 1962 for urban renewal. Another  plot of land in a prime area was donated by the al-Junied family to the Muslim Trust Fund (a  created by the al-Saggoffs) to be developed so that the income could be used for welfare projects. The Trust wanted to build a mosque and a madrasah, but building permission was not granted by the government. That piece of land was acquired in 1985. In present-day Singapore, the Arabs are no longer considered as the main landowners. Many Singapore Arabs regard the land acquisition policy as the main reason for both their loss of status and identity.

Fourth factor
The fourth factor is the use of professional trustees to manage the  instead of family members. Most of the large private family trusts had problems of mismanagement or breaches of trust and legal disputes. In many cases a professional trustee was then appointed, which had a similar effect to the Administration of Muslim Law Act: the management of the  became impersonal and the Arab families lost the social status of being associated with them.

Notable Arab Singaporeans
This article contains a list of notable Arab Singaporeans, people with Arab ancestry born or naturalized in Singapore.

Business
 Syed Abdul Rahman Alsagoff (Saiyid ʿAbd ar-Raḥman as-Saqqāf): Businessman in the spice trade and philanthropist from Hadhramawt. He was a descendant of Muhammad, and his son Ahmad was the son-in-law of Hajjah Fatimah.

Entertainment
 Sheikh Haikel bin Sheikh Salim Bajrai (born 1975): Rapper, actor and radio personality.

Politics
 Dr Ahmad bin Mohamed Mattar (born 1940): Former Minister for the Environment. Credited with cleaning up the Singapore River and other waterways. In 1972, he entered politics and successfully contested for a seat in Parliament, representing the constituency of Brickworks, and was to remain in Parliament until 1996. During his long and distinguished political career, he has held many senior government positions, first as Parliamentary Secretary for Education and then as Minister for Social Affairs, and finally as Minister for the Environment. In 1996, he retired from politics. He is currently the Chairman of IMC Technologies, a private educational institution, where he continues to make contributions to education in Singapore.

Armed Forces
 Syed Mohamed Syed Ahmad Alsagoff: Commander, Singapore Armed Forces. Born in Singapore, he had his education at the Victoria School. He later joined the Malayan Armed Forces, the predecessor of the Malaysian Armed Forces, rising to the rank of Major-General before his retirement in the 1970s. When Singapore was part of Malaysia from 1963–1965, he was the Commander of the Singapore Armed Forces, holding the rank of Brigadier-General. The Singapore Armed Forces then consisted of the 4th Malaysian Infantry Brigade which had two infantry regiments of about 1,000 soldiers each.

Acknowledgements
 The contents for the headings "Hadhrami migration" "Identification with the Malays" and "Contribution to Singapore" were largely or in part based on the book Kilat Senja: Sejarah Sosial dan Budaya Kampung-Kampung di Singapura by Hadijah Rahmat.

See also
 Arab diaspora
 Arab Indonesians
 Hadhrami people
 Jawi Peranakan
 Jawi script
 Tarim, Yemen
 Malay Singaporeans

References

External links
 Ba`alawi.com Ba'alawi.com | The Definitive Resource for Islam and the Alawiyyen Ancestry
 Reminder of the Arab Presence in Singapore
 The Arab Association Singapore
 Infopedia

Ethnic groups in Singapore
Arab groups
Arab diaspora in Asia
Hadhrami people